NASB may refer to:
 National Academy of Sciences of Belarus
 National Association of Student Broadcasting, predecessor of the UK Student Radio Association
 Naval Air Station Brunswick
 New American Standard Bible
 Nigerian Accounting Standards Board, now the Financial Reporting Council of Nigeria
 Nord-Amerikanischer Sängerbund
 Netherlands Aviation Safety Board
 Nickelodeon All-Star Brawl